Best of Gloucester County is the eighth full-length album by New Jersey indie rock band Danielson.

Track listing
 "Complimentary Dismemberment Insurance"
 "This Day Is a Loaf"
 "Grow Up"
 "Lil Norge"
 "But I Don't Wanna Sing About Guitars"
 "People's Partay"
 "Olympic Portions"
 "You Sleep Good Now"
 "Hovering Above That Hill"
 "Denominator Bluise"
 "Hosanna in the Forest"

Personnel
 Patrick Berkery - drums, percussion
 Rachel Galloway - vocal
 Evan Mazunik - piano, organ
 Megan Slaboda - vocal
 Daniel Smith- vocal, acoustic guitar
 Elin K. Smith - vocal
 Joshua Stamper - bass, horn arrangements
 Sufjan Stevens- banjo, vocal
 Andy Wilson - electric guitar
 Michael Cemprola - Alto and Tenor Saxophones
 Jon Rees - Baritone Saxophone, Piccolo
 Paul Arbogast - Tenor Trombone, Bass Trombone
 Jens Lekman - Swede vocal on "Lil Norge"
 Emil Nikolaisen (Serena-Maneesh) - electric guitar #2 on "Olympic Portions", "Hovering Above That Hill"
Electric guitar solos on "But I Don't Wanna Sing About Guitars": 
 Glen Galaxy (Soul-Junk)
 Mark Shippy (US Maple)
 Chris Cohen (Cryptacize)

References

External links
 Sounds Familyre Website

2011 albums
Danielson albums
Fire Records (UK) albums